Gail Kelly (née Currer) (born 25 April 1956) is a South African-born Australian businesswoman. In 2002, she became the first female CEO of a major Australian bank or top 15 company and in 2005 was the highest paid woman in an Australian corporation. She is the former chief executive officer (CEO) of Westpac, a role she held from 2008 to 2015. In 2010 Kelly was named 8th most powerful woman in the world by Forbes and as of 2014, she is listed in 56th place.

Biography

Early life and education
Gail Currer was born in Pretoria, South Africa. Currer attended the University of Cape Town where she undertook an arts degree majoring in history and Latin as well as a Diploma in Education. She married Allan Kelly in December 1977.

Teacher 
The couple moved to Rhodesia (now Zimbabwe) where she taught Latin at Falcon College while he served in the Rhodesian Army. They returned to South Africa where Allan Kelly studied medicine at the University of the Witswatersrand and Gail Kelly taught at a government high school.

Banking 
Kelly started work at the Nedcor Bank in 1980 as a teller but was fast-tracked into an accelerated training program. She started an MBA in 1986 while pregnant with her oldest daughter and graduated with distinction in 1987. In 1990, she became head of human resources at Nedcor (after having given birth to triplets five months earlier). From early 1992 to 1997 she held various other general manager positions at Nedcor, including cards and personal banking.

The Kellys were becoming disillusioned with South Africa in the middle of the 1990s and were looking to move to a different country. In June 1997, she flew to Sydney where she held interviews with four of the major banks and was appointed to a senior position at the Commonwealth Bank in July 1997.

Career in Australia
Kelly started work as the General Manager of Strategic Marketing in the Commonwealth Bank in October 1997. By 2002, she was head of the Customer Service Division responsible for running the Commonwealth Bank's extensive branch network.

Her performance at the Commonwealth Bank led her to be recruited as CEO of St. George Bank (after the death of the incumbent CEO from a heart attack). She commenced in January 2002 – at the time, St. George was seen as a possible takeover target (especially after the purchase of Colonial State Bank by the Commonwealth Bank) but Kelly increased the bank's profitability and achieved much higher levels on return on assets. In November 2004, St. George Bank gave Kelly a pay rise and extended her contract indefinitely with the capitalisation of the bank having risen by $3 billion since the start of her term as CEO. The Australian Banking & Finance magazine gave her an award for Best Financial Services Executive in 2003 and 2004.

Due to her success at St George, there was extensive media speculation in June 2005 that she would return to the Commonwealth Bank as CEO on the retirement of David Murray AO, but Kelly said that she was committed to remaining with St. George. Murray was replaced by Ralph Norris, the former CEO and managing director of Air New Zealand.

On Friday 17 August 2007, she announced her resignation as CEO of St. George Bank to take up the same position in Westpac from 2008. She started work as Westpac CEO on 1 February 2008.

On 12 May 2008 Kelly announced an $18.6 billion merger between Westpac and St. George Bank. The merger was approved by the Federal Court of Australia and finalised on 26 May 2008. The merger resulted in the new combined Westpac Group having 10 million customers, a 25% share of the Australian home loans market and with $108 billion investment funds under its administration.

In October 2010, Kelly announced a target to have women occupy 40% of the top 4000 managerial positions at Westpac, a task reported by The Australian newspaper to have been almost achieved by March 2012.

On 13 November 2014, Kelly announced that she would retire as CEO of the Westpac Group on 1 February 2015. Brian Hartzer, the head of Westpac's Australian financial services group, was appointed as her replacement.

On 1 August 2017, Kelly released her first book, Live Lead Learn: My Stories of Life and Leadership (Viking, an imprint of Penguin Random House). The book details her experiences of being a high-profile businesswoman and a mother of four.

Ranking
Forbes - Most Powerful Women in the World

Fortune - Various

Financial Times

The Australian Financial Review/Boss Magazine

Other Australian Newspapers

Other Publications

References

External links
 Crown Content, Who's Who in Australia 2005 North Melbourne Victoria page 1050
 Melbourne Age profile of Gail Kelly, 2 July 2005
 ABC Australia Business Breakfast transcript 7 May 2003
 Sydney Morning Herald article on Kelly's contract extension at St George in November 2004
 Weekend Australian story about Kelly being a favourite to succeed David Murray at the Commonwealth Bank

1956 births
Living people
Australian women in business
People from Pretoria
South African emigrants to Australia
University of Cape Town alumni
Westpac people
White South African people